Correbidia terminalis is a moth in the subfamily Arctiinae. It was described by Francis Walker in 1856. It is found from Mexico through Central America (including Guatemala, Costa Rica, Panama) and Cuba and Puerto Rico to South America (including Venezuela).

It is an extremely polymorphic species with the forewings varying from plain orange through banded orange and black to almost black.

The larvae feed on the leaves of Cecropia peltata.

References

Moths described in 1856
Arctiinae